Close Enough for Ska is the first full-length release by I Voted for Kodos.

The title refers to a phrase the band typically used while they were tuning up before shows: "We can never quite get in tune or do the songs completely right every time so we often end up saying that the sound isn't perfect but that's close enough for ska," drummer Paul Renke said in an interview. This itself is a reference to the well-known phrase "close enough for jazz."

Track listing
All songs were written by Chris Holoyda and Rick Bisenius.
 "Just Want You to Know"
 "You Never Asked Me To"
 "Todd"
 "Going Down"
 "She Hates Ska"
 "Calc Lecture Girl"
 "Shallow Grave"
 "http://www.dumped.com"
 "What Happens Next?"
 "Wish I Was Aaron"
 "Gunpoint"

Credits
Rick Bisenius - lead vocals, trombone, tenor sax
Chris Holoyda - guitar, synth
Lee Gordon – mellophone, backing vocals, guitar
Nick Rydell - alto sax
Andrew Anderson - piano, organ, trumpet
Ross Gilliland - bass
Paul Reinke - drums

References 

2001 albums
I Voted for Kodos albums